Dan Fröberg (born 13 August 1964) is a retired Swedish football striker.

References

1964 births
Living people
Swedish footballers
Degerfors IF players
IFK Göteborg players
Karlstad BK players
Association football forwards
Allsvenskan players